Holy Mother of God Cathedral, also known as Surb Astvatsamor Hovanu Cathedral, is a church of the Armenian Apostolic Church, located in the city of Stepanakert, Nagorno-Karabakh Republic. A 4-meter statue of King Vachagan III was planned to be placed on a 2-meter pedestal near the church. The church - under construction for 12 years - was consecrated on April 7, 2019.

History 
The cathedral became a bomb shelter during the 2020 Nagorno-Karabakh war, with civilians taking refuge in the basement of the cathedral from Azerbaijan's bombardment of Stepanakert.

Gallery

References 

Buildings and structures in Stepanakert
Churches in the Republic of Artsakh
Armenian Apostolic cathedrals
Church buildings with domes
Churches completed in 2019
Diocese of Artsakh
2019 establishments in the Republic of Artsakh